Francis Dady Ngoye (born 4 January 1990) is a Congolese professional footballer who plays as a midfielder for Championnat National 2 club Thonon Evian.

Career
Born in Kinshasa, DR Congo, Dady Ngoye moved to France at the age of 2. A youth product of Grenoble, Dady Ngoye joined Yzeure and in 2016 moved back to his childhood club Grenoble. He made his professional debut for Grenoble in a 1–0 Ligue 2 win over Sochaux on 27 July 2018.

Honours 
Thonon Evian

 Championnat National 3: 2021–22

References

External links
 
 
 
 Foot National Profile

1990 births
Living people
Footballers from Kinshasa
Democratic Republic of the Congo footballers
French footballers
Democratic Republic of the Congo emigrants to France
French sportspeople of Democratic Republic of the Congo descent
Association football midfielders
Moulins Yzeure Foot players
Grenoble Foot 38 players
Rodez AF players
Thonon Evian Grand Genève F.C. players
Ligue 2 players
Championnat National players
Championnat National 2 players
Championnat National 3 players
Black French sportspeople